"More Than One Way to Love a Woman" is a 1979 single by R&B band Raydio released on Arista Records. The song reached number 25 on the U.S. Billboard Hot Soul Songs chart.

Overview
"More Than One Way to Love a Woman" was composed and produced by Raydio's leader Ray Parker Jr. The single's B-side was "Hot Stuff". Both tracks came from Raydio's second studio album Rock On.

Critical reception
Ace Adams of the New York Daily News called the song one of the album's "best numbers".

References

1979 singles
Raydio songs
Arista Records singles